Erasmus Albert Willson (13 October 1878 – 17 April 1948) was an English first-class cricketer active 1898 who played for Kent. He was born and died in Sittingbourne.

References

1878 births
1948 deaths
English cricketers
Kent cricketers
People from Sittingbourne